McCutchen Meadows is a historic mansion in Auburn, Kentucky, USA. The mansion was built circa 1825. It has been listed on the National Register of Historic Places since November 23, 1984.

References

Houses on the National Register of Historic Places in Kentucky
Greek Revival architecture in Kentucky
Colonial Revival architecture in Kentucky
Houses completed in 1825
National Register of Historic Places in Logan County, Kentucky
Plantations in Kentucky